Academy Luka Kaliterna is the youth team of HNK Hajduk Split. There are a total of ten age categories within the academy, the oldest being u-19 and youngest u-8.

From the 2014–15 season, HNK Hajduk Split Reserves was formed and replaced the U-19 team to compete in Croatia's reorganised Third Division. The newly formed reserve teams in Croatian football replaced U-19 teams, with the national U-19 competition dissolved before formed again the next year, during 2015–16 season. The new reserve teams are not able to play in the same division as their senior teams. Therefore, Hajduk II is ineligible for promotion to the Prva HNL and may progress only up to Druga HNL as long as the senior team is in Prva HNL. Reserve team is also not permitted to enter the Croatian Cup. The reserve team is intended to be the final step between the academy and the first team, and is made up of promising youngsters between the age of 18 and 21, with up to five players over the age of 21 eligible to play each week. Hajduk II team stopped existing at the end of season 20-21 due to high costs, and small benefit.

Current quad (Hajduk U-19)

Players with multiple nationalities
   Noah Skoko
   Niko Sigur
   Ante Prusina
   Mark Hrvojević

Out on loan

Source: Hajduk.hr

Recent seasons

Current squad (Hajduk U-17)

Some players are listed on both Hajduk U-19 and Hajduk U-17 teams as they play games for both teams.

Recent seasons

Current squad (Hajduk U-15)

Recent seasons

Hajduk 2 recent seasons

Key
 League: P = Matches played; W = Matches won; D = Matches drawn; L = Matches lost; F = Goals for; A = Goals against; Pts = Points won; Pos = Final position.

Current staff
Updated 20 November 2022

UEFA Youth League record

Honours

References

External links
Official website

Reserves and Academy
Hajduk Split
UEFA Youth League teams